Joaquim Gomes is a municipality located in Alagoas, Brazil. It had a population of 24,081 as of 2020, and an area of 239 km².

The extinct and unattested Wasu language was spoken in the Serra do Azul of Joaquim Gomes.

References

Municipalities in Alagoas